Matías Israel Cortave (born 27 June 1992) is an Argentine professional footballer who plays as a centre-back for Quilmes.

Career
Cortave began his career in 2013 with Brown of Primera B Nacional. He was selected in nine matches, including for his professional debut on 8 November against Almirante Brown, during the 2013–14 campaign which ended with relegation to Primera B Metropolitana. Thirteen appearances followed across two seasons, with the latter three arriving in the club's title-winning campaign of 2015. On 19 July 2016, Cortave completed a move to Israel to join Liga Leumit side Maccabi Herzliya. He participated in thirty-seven matches, making his last appearance for them in May 2017 in a 2–0 defeat to Hapoel Nir Ramat HaSharon at Grundman Stadium.

September 2017 saw Cortave rejoin Primera B Nacional's Brown. He played a part in twenty fixtures in his first season back with the Adrogué club in 2017–18. Cortave left one season and twelve appearances later, as he agreed a move across the division to Deportivo Morón. He remained for two campaigns, featuring a total of twenty-six times. In January 2021, Cortave was announced as a new signing by Ecuadorian Serie A side Macará. At the end of January 2022, Cortave returned to his homeland again, when he signed with Quilmes.

Career statistics
.

Honours
Brown
Primera B Metropolitana: 2015

References

External links

1992 births
Living people
Argentine footballers
Argentine expatriate footballers
People from Quilmes
Association football defenders
Sportspeople from Buenos Aires Province
Primera Nacional players
Primera B Metropolitana players
Liga Leumit players
Club Atlético Brown footballers
Maccabi Herzliya F.C. players
Deportivo Morón footballers
C.S.D. Macará footballers
Quilmes Atlético Club footballers
Expatriate footballers in Israel
Expatriate footballers in Ecuador
Argentine expatriate sportspeople in Israel
Argentine expatriate sportspeople in Ecuador